The 2019 World RX of Catalunya-Barcelona was the second round of the sixth season of the FIA World Rallycross Championship. The event was held at the Circuit de Barcelona-Catalunya in Montmeló, Catalonia.

Supercar 

Source

Heats

Semi-finals 

 Semi-Final 1

 Semi-Final 2

Final

Standings after the event 

Source

 Note: Only the top five positions are included.

References 

|- style="text-align:center"
|width="35%"|Previous race:2019 World RX of Abu Dhabi
|width="40%"|FIA World Rallycross Championship2019 season
|width="35%"|Next race:2019 World RX of Belgium
|- style="text-align:center"
|width="35%"|Previous race:2018 World RX of Barcelona
|width="40%"|World RX of Catalunya
|width="35%"|Next race:2020 World RX of Catalunya
|- style="text-align:center"

Spain
World RX
World RX